The Three Weird Sisters is a 1948 British melodrama film directed by Daniel Birt and starring Nancy Price, Mary Clare, Mary Merrall, Nova Pilbeam and Raymond Lovell.  The film has Gothic influences. The screenplay was adapted by Dylan Thomas and Louise Birt from the novel The Case of the Weird Sisters by Charlotte Armstrong (mistitled The Case of the Three Weird Sisters in the opening credits).  The film was Birt's feature film directorial debut. It also marked the last screen appearance of Nova Pilbeam, who retired from acting after it was completed.

Plot
The elderly Morgan-Vaughan sisters Gertrude (Price), Maude (Clare) and Isobel (Merrall) live in a decaying and claustrophobic mansion in a Welsh mining village.  Gertrude is blind, Maude is almost deaf and Isobel is crippled by arthritis. The coalmine from which the family made their fortune is almost worked out, and its tunnels and shafts are dangerously unstable. When a section of the underground workings collapses, destroying a row of local cottages and unsettling the foundations of the mansion, the sisters feel honour-bound to finance repairs, but do not have the means to do so.

The sisters' younger half-brother Owen (Lovell), who left the village as a young man to pursue his education and has subsequently become a wealthy businessman in London, is sent for on the assumption that he will provide the necessary finances. Owen and his secretary Claire (Pilbeam) arrive from London to a cold reception. The somewhat simple-minded Thomas throws a stone that strikes Owen in the head as they drive up, and Mabli Hughes openly voices his contempt for Owen. The sisters are disconcerted to discover that he feels no sense of responsibility towards either them or the community and has no interest in contributing any money.

Dr David Davies (Anthony Hulme) recommends that Owen avoid driving for a day, so he and Claire stay the night. Strange events start to happen and eventually convince Claire that the sisters are plotting to murder Owen in order to lay hands on his money. She tries to alert other residents of the village to her suspicions, but at first is not taken seriously. Gradually, however, the doctor comes round to Claire's point of view and deduces that there is indeed a plot, instigated by the dominant Maude.

Cast
 Nancy Price as Gertrude Morgan-Vaughan
 Mary Clare as Maude Morgan-Vaughan
 Mary Merrall as Isobel Morgan-Vaughan
 Nova Pilbeam as Claire Prentiss
 Anthony Hulme as Dr. David Davies
 Raymond Lovell as Owen Morgan-Vaughan
 Elwyn Brook-Jones as Thomas
 Edward Rigby as Waldo
 Hugh Griffith as Mabli Hughes
 Marie Ault as Beattie
 David Davies as Police Sergeant
 Hugh Pryse as Minister
 Frank Crawshaw as Bank Manager
 Frank Dunlop as Ben
 Lloyd Pearson as Solicitor
 Doreen Richards as Mrs. Probert
 Bartlett Mullins as Dispenser

References

External links 
 
 
 

1948 films
1948 drama films
Films directed by Daniel Birt
British black-and-white films
Films based on American novels
Films set in Wales
British drama films
Films based on works by Charlotte Armstrong
1948 directorial debut films
Films shot at British National Studios
1940s English-language films
1940s British films